Nathan Whittaker (3 February 1863 — 1922) was an English professional footballer, referee, secretary and manager.

Playing career
Whittaker played for local club Accrington in the Football League, before moving to London for a teaching role. Whilst in London, Whittaker played for Tottenham Hotspur.

Refereeing and secretarial career
Following his playing career, Whittaker moved into a secretarial role in football, sitting on the councils for The Football Association, the Referees' Association, the London Football Association and the Southern Football League.

Alongside his secretarial commitments, Whittaker was also a referee, refereeing games in the Football League and the Southern League. The biggest distinction in Whittaker's career came on 20 April 1907, when he refereed in the 1907 FA Cup Final, in a game that saw "fouls rather plentiful".

Managerial career
On 25 April 1907, Whittaker was present at a public meeting in which it was decided for Croydon Common to become a professional club. In December 1909, Whittaker was appointed manager of Croydon Common. In February 1910, Whittaker was replaced as manager by Dave Gardner.

Personal life
Whittaker's brother, Spen, was also a footballer, later managing Burnley until his death in 1910.

References

1863 births
1922 deaths
People from Church, Lancashire
Association football midfielders
English footballers
English football managers
Accrington F.C. players
Tottenham Hotspur F.C. players
English Football League players
Southern Football League players
English football referees
FA Cup Final referees
Association football executives
English educators